"Audacity" is a song by English rapper Stormzy, featuring vocals from British rapper and songwriter Headie One. It was released as a single on 11 December 2019 as the fifth single from his second studio album Heavy Is the Head.

Music video
A music video to accompany the release of "Audacity" was first released onto YouTube on 11 December 2019.

Charts

Certifications

Release history

References

2019 songs
2019 singles
Stormzy songs
Songs written by Stormzy
Songs written by Fraser T. Smith
Song recordings produced by Fraser T. Smith
Headie One songs